The Conservative Party Conference (CPC) is a four-day national conference event held by the Conservative Party in the United Kingdom. It takes place every year around October during the British party conference season, when the House of Commons is in recess. The event's location has alternated between Birmingham's International Convention Centre (ICC) and Manchester's Central Convention Complex since 2008. Previously, it had alternated between Blackpool and Bournemouth. In contrast to the Liberal Democrat Conference, where every party member attending its Conference, either in-person or online, has the right to vote on party policy, under a one member, one vote system, or the Labour Party Conference, where 50% of votes are allocated to affiliated organisations (such as trade unions), and in which all voting is restricted to nominated representatives (known as delegates), the Conservative Party Conference does not hold votes on party policy.

The Conference, which consists of fringe events, receptions, and speeches, gives Conservative Party members, the press, and the public a chance to learn about the party's ideas and policies for the year ahead. The focal event is the leader's speech, which is given by the incumbent Leader of the Conservative Party at the end of conference. 

In some special circumstances, the leader will make a speech at the opening of conference. At the 2016 Conservative Party Conference in Birmingham, Prime Minister Theresa May addressed the conference on its opening day in her speech "Global Britain: Making a success of Brexit."

At the 2017 conference, Theresa May suffered from a combination of a prankster handing her a P45, a hacking cough, and the words on the set collapsing behind her.

An exhibition area is also featured every year allowing businesses and Conservative Party-affiliated organisations to promote their brands and messages from exhibition stands throughout the conference period. The Chairman of the Conservative Party Conference is always the current President of the National Conservative Convention, the parliament of the Voluntary Party. 

The National Convention meets twice a year—its Annual General Meeting is usually held at Spring Forum, with another meeting usually held at the Party Conference. Since 2017, the Democratic Unionist Party has hosted an annual reception at the conference, owing to the alliance between the two parties in the 2017-2019 parliament.

See also
 Labour Party Conference
 Liberal Democrat Conference
 Party conference season

References

External links
Conservative Conference Website

 
Annual events in the United Kingdom
Conferences
Conferences in the United Kingdom
Political conferences
Political events
Political events in the United Kingdom
Political party assemblies